Asbury College may refer to:

 Asbury College (Maryland), a former Methodist college in Baltimore, Maryland
 Asbury University, a liberal arts school in Wilmore, Kentucky, formerly known as Asbury College
 DePauw University, a liberal arts college in Greencastle, Indiana, formerly known as Indiana Asbury College or Asbury College

See also
 Ashbury College, Ottawa, Ontario, Canada